Blastobasis evanescens is a moth in the  family Blastobasidae. It was described by Walsingham in 1901. It is found on Corsica.

References

Natural History Museum Lepidoptera generic names catalog

Blastobasis
Moths described in 1901